Willie Green (born 1981) is an American basketball player and coach.

Willie Green may also refer to:
Willie Green (American football) (born 1966), American football player 
Willie Green (baseball), Negro leagues third baseman
Willie Earl Green, sent to prison in 1983 for murder but released in 2008 after a change in testimony

See also
Willie Greene (born 1971), American baseball player
Will Green (disambiguation)
William Green (disambiguation)